Prussian Nights is a long poem by Aleksandr Solzhenitsyn, who served as a captain in the Soviet Red Army during the Second World War. Prussian Nights describes the Red Army's march across East Prussia, and focuses on the traumatic acts of rape and murder that Solzhenitsyn witnessed as a participant in that march.

Originally it was Chapter 8 of his huge autobiographic poem Dorozhen'ka (The Road) that he wrote in 1947 as a sharashka (scientific research camp) inmate. The original poem did not survive, but in 1950–1951, working in a hard labour camp near Ekibastuz, Solzhenitsyn restored Chapter 8 and Chapter 9 (The Feast of the Victors) as separate poems. The poem is in trochaic tetrameter, "in imitation of, and argument with the most famous Russian war poem, Aleksandr Tvardovsky's Vasili Tyorkin."

The poem is based on Solzhenitsyn's own experiences – he was a captain of an artillery battery which formed a part of the Second Belorussian Front, which invaded East Prussia from south-east in January 1945. The Soviet offensive followed the path of the disastrous offensive by the Russian Second Army under Alexander Samsonov during World War I; the comparison with the Soviet victorious offensive is one of the underlying themes of the poem.

Solzhenitsyn was arrested soon afterwards, in early February, three weeks after the offensive had started. His arrest was partly due to his critique of the treatment of civilians. In the poem he recalls the pillages, rapes and murders committed by the Soviet troops taking their revenge on German civilians, the events which later resulted in the first part of the German exodus from Eastern Europe, 

Solzhenitsyn composed the poem—about twelve hundred lines and over fifty pages long—while he was serving a sentence of hard labor in Gulag camps. He wrote a few lines of the poem each day on a bar of soap and memorized them while using it in his daily shower. He also wrote about how composing this poem helped him to survive his imprisonment: "I needed a clear head, because for two years I had been writing a poem—a most rewarding poem that helped me not to notice what was being done to my body. Sometimes, while standing in a column of dejected prisoners, amidst the shouts of guards with machine guns, I felt such a rush of rhymes and images that I seemed to be wafted overhead . . . At such moments I was both free and happy . . . Some prisoners tried to escape by smashing a car through the barbed wire. For me there was no barbed wire. The head count of prisoners remained unchanged, but I was actually away on a distant flight."

He wrote down the poem between the 1950s and 1970s. He made a recording of it in 1969; it was not published in Russian until 1974 when it was published in Paris, France. A German translation was done by Nikolaus Ehlert in 1976, and it was officially first translated into English by Robert Conquest in 1977.

Critical reaction was mixed. The New York Times reviewed it thus: "a clumsy and disjointed 1400 line narrative which can be called poetry only because it is written in meter and rhyme. Sent to any publishing house of émigré Russian journal bearing any name but Solzhenitsyn's, it would be rejected unhesitatingly." A reviewer in New York Review of Books called Prussian Nights, "for all its shortcomings, a powerful and moving work. The literary critic, author and poet Clive James took a more positive view:

See also
Evacuation of East Prussia
Lev Kopelev

References

Further reading
 Complete text of the "Prussian Nights" poem in Russian, published by Ymca-Press, Paris, 1974:  Прусские ночи — А. Солженицын. PDF file, direct download 210 KB (64 pages). Printed in Belgium.
 Carl R. Proffer, Russia in Prussia, The New York Times, August 7, 1977
 Solzhenitsyn, Aleksandr I(sayevich) 1918–: Critical Essay by William J. Parente from Literature Criticism Series

Poetry by Aleksandr Solzhenitsyn
World War II poems
East Prussia
Poems about rape